Carlo Sgombrino (1619 – October 1686) was a Roman Catholic prelate who served as Bishop of Catanzaro (1672–1686) and Bishop of Belcastro (1652–1672).

Biography
Carlo Sgombrino was born in 1619 in Airola, Italy.
On 11 December 1652, he was appointed during the papacy of Pope Innocent X as Bishop of Belcastro.
On 29 December 1652, he was consecrated bishop by Marcantonio Franciotti, Cardinal-Priest of Santa Maria della Pace, with Ranuccio Scotti Douglas, Bishop Emeritus of Borgo San Donnino, serving as co-consecrator.
On 8 February 1672, he was appointed during the papacy of Pope Clement X as Bishop of Catanzaro.
He served as Bishop of Catanzaro until his death in October 1686.

References

External links and additional sources
 (for Chronology of Bishops) 
 (for Chronology of Bishops) 
 (for Chronology of Bishops) 
 (for Chronology of Bishops) 

17th-century Italian Roman Catholic bishops
Bishops appointed by Pope Innocent X
Bishops appointed by Pope Clement X
1619 births
1686 deaths